An ampere-hour or amp-hour (symbol: A⋅h or A h; often simplified as Ah) is a unit of electric charge, having dimensions of electric current multiplied by time, equal to the charge transferred by a steady current of one ampere flowing for one hour, or 3,600 coulombs. 

The commonly seen milliampere-hour (symbol: mA⋅h, mA h, often simplified as mAh) is one-thousandth of an ampere-hour (3.6 coulombs).

Use
The ampere-hour is frequently used in measurements of electrochemical systems such as electroplating and for battery capacity where the commonly known nominal voltage is dropped.

A milliampere second (mA⋅s) is a unit of measurement used in X-ray imaging, diagnostic imaging, and radiation therapy. It is equivalent to a millicoulomb. This quantity is proportional to the total X-ray energy produced by a given X-ray tube operated at a particular voltage. The same total dose can be delivered in different time periods depending on the X-ray tube current.

To help express energy, computation over charge values in ampere-hour requires precise data of voltage: in a battery system, for example, accurate calculation of the energy delivered requires integration of the power delivered (product of instantaneous voltage and instantaneous current) over the discharge interval. Generally, the battery voltage varies during discharge; an average value or nominal value may be used to approximate the integration of power.

When comparing the energy capacities of battery-based products that might have different internal cell chemistries and/or cell configurations, a simple ampere-hour rating is often insufficient. For example, at 3.2 V for a LiFePO4 battery cell, the perceived energy capacity of a small UPS product that has multiple DC outputs at different voltages but is simply listed with a single ampere-hour rating, e.g., 8800 mAh, would be exaggerated by a factor of 3.75 compared to that of a sealed 12-volt lead-acid battery where the ampere-hour rating, e.g., 7 Ah, is based on the total output voltage rather than the internal cell voltage, so the 12-volt output of the example UPS product can actually deliver only about a third of the energy of the example battery, not a quarter more energy. But a direct replacement product for the example battery, in the same form factor and comparable output voltage and energy capacity but based on LiFePO4, might also be specified as 7 Ah, here based on output voltage rather than cell chemistry. For consumers without an engineering background, these difficulties would be avoided by a specification of the watt-hour rating instead (or additionally).

In other units of electric charge
One ampere-hour is equal to (up to 4 significant figures):  
 3,600 coulombs
 2.247 × 1022 elementary charges
 0.03731 faradays
 1.079 × 1013 statcoulombs (CGS-ESU equivalent)
 360 abcoulombs (CGS-EMU equivalent)

Examples
An AA size dry cell has a capacity of about 2,000 to 3,000 milliampere-hours.
An average smartphone battery usually has between 2,500 and 4,000 milliampere-hours of electric capacity.
Automotive car batteries vary in capacity but a large automobile propelled by an internal combustion engine would have about a 50-ampere-hour battery capacity.
Since one ampere-hour can produce 0.336 grams of aluminium from molten aluminium chloride, producing a ton of aluminium required transfer of at least 2.98 million ampere-hours.

See also
Electrochemical equivalent
Kilowatt-hour (kW⋅h)

References

Units of electrical charge
Non-SI metric units